In probability theory, a branch of mathematics Poisson-Dirichlet distributions are probability distributions on the set of nonnegative, non-decreasing sequences with sum 1, depending on two parameters  and . It can be defined as follows. This definition is due to Jim Pitman and Marc Yor. It generalizes Kingman's law, which corresponds to the particular case .

Number theory  

Random permutations and Ewens's sampling formula  
The probability distribution  is called Ewens's distribution, and  comes from the Ewens's sampling formula, first introduced by Warren Ewens in population genetics, in order to describe the probabilities associated with counts of how many different alleles are observed a given number of times in the sample.

References 

Probability distributions